Buchanan House may refer to:

Tompkins-Buchanan House, Louisville, Kentucky, listed on the National Register of Historic Places listings in Jefferson County, Kentucky
Buchanan House (Roachville, Kentucky), listed on the National Register of Historic Places in Green County, Kentucky
Stevens-Buchanan House, Brandon, Mississippi, listed on the National Register of Historic Places listings in Rankin County, Mississippi
Wheatland (James Buchanan House), former residence of President James Buchanan outside of Lancaster, Pennsylvania
Buchanan House (Decatur, Tennessee), listed on the National Register of Historic Places in Meigs County, Tennessee
I.W.P. Buchanan House, Lebanon, Tennessee, listed on the National Register of Historic Places listings in Wilson County, Tennessee
James Buchanan House (Nashville, Tennessee), listed on the National Register of Historic Places in Davidson County, Tennessee
J. C. Buchanan House, Bastrop, Texas, listed on the National Register of Historic Places listings in Bastrop County, Texas
Buchanan-Hayter-Witherspoon House, Mansfield, Texas, listed on the National Register of Historic Places listings in Tarrant County, Texas
Dr. Trueblood House, Kirkland, Washington, also known as Buchanan House, listed on the National Register of Historic Places listings in King County, Washington

See also
James Buchanan House (disambiguation)